The GE Elec-Trak was the first commercially produced all-electric garden tractor, made mostly between 1969 and 1975 at GE's Outdoor Power Equipment Operation under Bruce R. Laumeister.  Despite their limited production and availability, many Elec-Traks are still in use today and have a cult following among tractor and electric vehicle enthusiasts.  They are an archetypal or seminal design that has influenced all later electric tractors.

Several models were produced, including: the E8M and ER8-36 (8 hp equivalent); the E10M (10 hp); the E12 and E12M (12 hp); the E12S and E15 (14 hp); the E16 (an upgraded variant of the E15), and the E20 (16 hp). GE's claimed horsepower figures were notional and inconsistent in documentation and sales literature; the table below includes "real" horsepower.  The E8M and ER8-36 were styled more as ride-on mowers than tractors. The "M" suffix used on some models indicates the ability to accommodate a mid-mounted (belly) mower,<ref name=Models>GE sales publication GEZ-5674 Colored brochure of all tractors</ref>  and an "H" was used on some models to indicate a heavy duty, extra range battery pack.

Starting in 1972, GE also made an industrial version of the Elec-Trak, the I-5, compliant with all relevant sections of ANSI B56.1-1969 and OSHA FMEC Class E. Mostly identical to the E-20, it was orange instead of yellow, had a 12vdc warning horn, fenders over the front wheels, and attachment points for additional accessories, including a roll cage and forklifts of varying heights that could be mounted either forward or rear facing.

Elec-Trak branded attachments included electric trimmers, edgers, chainsaws, radios, arc welders, fork lifts, front-end loaders, rotary brooms, roller aerators, lawn rollers, dump carts, maintenance carts, large vacuums, agricultural sprayers, moldboard plows, row crop cultivators, tillers, disk harrows, sickle bar mowers, belly mowers, front-mounted rotary mowers, front or rear-mounted ganged reel mowers, lawn sweepers, electric rakes, snowplows, golf bag holders, double seats, 120vac rotary inverters, canopy tops, and more. The snowblower was commonly called snowthrower to draw distinction from the more mass marketable Leafblower certainly cheaper and more easily produced then anything ruggedized for below freezing that only sees use from the occasional snowfall. General Electric Picture from Schenectady Dept of Advertising and Sales Promotion. B/W 9:10 long, ripped from a projector Reel, states 'Thrower' ~10 times Scanned brochure - 1972 Attachments and Accessories  Electric crop sprayers were advertised and sold, but GE discontinued the product and refunded all orders in 1974 due to low demand.

A 36VDC "accessory outlet" for NEMA L2-20 twist-lock connectors, mounted under the hood overhang on the left side, is used to power handheld tools.  High current draw front and mid-mounted attachments connect to a 36VDC "power take off" using a NEMA 10-50 outlet, mounted forward of the accessory outlet.  The NEMA 10-50 is a heavy, thick bladed design rated for 50A at 250VAC (readily available in the 1970s in the USA for use with 240VAC clothes dryers) that GE empirically found to be capable of the far higher currents drawn by the snowblower at 36VDC. An Anderson connector, standard on the I-5 and optionally available for other models, was mounted under the right rear fender for rear-mounted heavy current draw attachments such as the vacuums, sickle bar, and rear electric lift.

After the shutdown of production at GE, Elec-Traks were produced under the Wheel Horse and Avco New IdeaSteve Shore, http://www.watts-up-elec-traks.com/ge-elec-trak-history.html  labels.

Some time after the final shutdown of the Wheel Horse line in 1983, all remaining parts and dies were sold to Bill Gunn, a dealer in Edgerton, Wisconsin.  Eventually, Gunn retired and all remaining stock was sold to Jim Coate of the Electric Tractor Store.

 Motors 

 Notes 

References
 Internet Elec-Trak discussion list
 George Beckett's history of the Elec-Trak
 Steve Shore's history of the Elec-Trak
 Garden Tractor Talk's GE forum
  E15 restoration at BuildItSolar
  Mark Frerking on Elec-Traks (Dec 9, 2007)
 Electric Tractors and Mowers at EValbum
 Tools Terra - Tools Reviewed
 Mike Bryce, "The Elec-Trak Rides Again" Home Power #70, April/May 1999
 Jim Coate, "EVs Can Bring RE to the Field" The Natural Farmer September 2005
 Oscar H. Will III, Garden Tractors. Voyageur Press (2009) 
 Michael A. Martino, Straight from the horse's mouth: The Wheel Horse story''. Stemgas Pub. Co (2000) 
 E. F. Lindsley, "Fantastic Elec-Trak runs on batteries, powers your electric tools too" Popular Science July 1970
 James M. Liston, "GE introduces the Electric Tractor" Popular Mechanics April 1970

External links
 Scanned copy of the Clean Power Supply catalog
 Zero Turn Mowers & Walk Behind Lawn Mowers
 Used and NOS parts and tractors at Watts-Up-Elec-Traks
 Elec-Traks tractors, parts and manuals at Kansas Wind Power
 The Electric Tractor Store, offering parts and restoration advice

Lawn mowers
Gardening tools
Tractors